John Uhler Lemmon III (February 8, 1925 – June 27, 2001) was an American actor. Considered equally proficient in both dramatic and comic roles, Lemmon was known for his anxious, middle-class everyman screen persona in dramedy pictures, leading The Guardian to coin him "the most successful tragi-comedian of his age."

He starred in over sixty films and was nominated for an Academy Award eight times, winning twice, and received many other accolades, including six Golden Globe Awards (counting the honorary Cecil B. DeMille Award), two Cannes Film Festival Awards, two Volpi Cups, one Silver Bear, three BAFTA Awards, and two Emmy Awards. In 1988, he was awarded the American Film Institute's Lifetime Achievement Award for his contributions to the American cinema.

His best known films include Mister Roberts (1955, for which he won the year's Oscar for Best Supporting Actor), Some Like It Hot (1959), The Apartment (1960), Days of Wine and Roses (1962), Irma la Douce (1963), The Great Race (1965), Save the Tiger (1973, for which he won Best Actor), The China Syndrome (1979), Missing (1982), and Glengarry Glen Ross (1992). He also acted in several Broadway plays, earning Tony Award nominations for Tribute and the 1986 revival of Long Day's Journey into Night.

Lemmon had a long-running collaboration with actor and real-life friend Walter Matthau, which The New York Times called "one of Hollywood's most successful pairings," that spanned ten films between 1966 and 1998; The Fortune Cookie (1966), The Odd Couple (1968) and its sequel The Odd Couple II (1998), The Front Page (1974), Buddy Buddy (1981), JFK (1991), Grumpy Old Men (1993) and its sequel Grumpier Old Men (1995), The Grass Harp (1995), and Out to Sea (1997).

Early life and education 
Lemmon was born on February 8, 1925, in an elevator at Newton-Wellesley Hospital in Newton, Massachusetts. He was the only child of Mildred Burgess (née LaRue; 1896–1967) and John Uhler Lemmon II (1893–1962), president of the Doughnut Corporation of America. John Uhler Lemmon II was of Irish heritage, and Jack Lemmon was raised Catholic. His parents had a difficult marriage, and separated permanently when Lemmon was 18, but never divorced. He attended John Ward Elementary School in Newton and the Rivers School in Weston, Massachusetts. Often unwell as a child, Lemmon had three significant operations on his ears before he turned 10. He had spent two years in hospital by the time he turned 12.

During his acceptance of his lifetime achievement award, he stated that he knew he wanted to be an actor from the age of eight. He began to act in school productions. Lemmon attended Rivers Country Day School and Phillips Andover Academy (Class of 1943), where he pursued track sports with success, and Harvard College (Class of 1947), where he lived in Eliot House. At Harvard, he was president of the Hasty Pudding Club and vice president of Dramatic and Delphic Clubs. Except for drama and music, however, he was an unexceptional student.

Forbidden to act onstage due to academic probation, Lemmon broke Harvard rules to appear in roles using pseudonyms such as Timothy Orange.

A member of the V-12 Navy College Training Program, Lemmon was commissioned by the United States Navy, serving briefly as an ensign on the aircraft carrier  during World War II before returning to Harvard after completing his military service. After graduation with a degree in War Service Sciences in 1947, he studied acting under coach Uta Hagen at HB Studio in New York City. He was also a pianist, who became devoted to the instrument at age 14 and learned to play by ear. For about a year in New York City, he worked unpaid as a waiter and master of ceremonies at the Old Knick bar on Second Avenue. He also played the piano at the venue.

Career

1949–1965: Early years
Lemmon became a professional actor, working on radio and Broadway. His film debut was a bit part as a plasterer in the film The Lady Takes a Sailor (1949), but he had already appeared in television shows, which numbered about 400 from 1948 to 1953.

Lemmon believed his stage career was about to take off when he was appearing on Broadway for the first time in a 1953 revival of the comedy Room Service, but the production closed after two weeks. Despite this setback, he was spotted by talent scout Max Arnow, who was then working for Columbia, and Lemmon's focus shifted to films and Hollywood. Columbia's head, Harry Cohn, wanted to change Lemmon's name, in case it was used to describe the quality of the actor's films, but he successfully resisted.

His first role as a leading man was in the comedy It Should Happen to You (1954), which also featured the established Judy Holliday in the female lead. Bosley Crowther in his review for The New York Times described Lemmon as possessing "a warm and appealing personality. The screen should see more of him." The two leads soon reunited in Phffft (also 1954). Kim Novak had a secondary role as a brief love interest for Lemmon's character. "If it wasn't for Judy, I'm not sure I would have concentrated on films", he told The Washington Post in 1986 saying early in his career he had a snobbish attitude towards films over the stage. He managed to negotiate a contract with Columbia allowing him leeway to pursue other projects, some of the terms of which he said "nobody had gotten before". He signed a seven-year contract, but ended up staying with Columbia for 10 years. Lemmon's appearance as Ensign Pulver in Mister Roberts (1955), with James Cagney, Henry Fonda, and William Powell for Warner Bros., gained Lemmon the Best Supporting Actor Oscar. Director John Ford decided to cast Lemmon after seeing his Columbia screen test, which had been directed by Richard Quine. At an impromptu meeting on the studio lot, Ford persuaded the actor to appear in the film, although Lemmon did not realize he was in conversation with Ford at the time.

In the military farce Operation Mad Ball (1957) set in a U.S. Army base in France after World War II, Lemmon played a calculating private. He met comedian Ernie Kovacs, who co-starred, and they became close friends, appearing together in two subsequent films, as a warlock in Bell, Book and Candle (1958, a film he apparently disliked) and It Happened to Jane (1959), all three under the direction of Richard Quine. Lemmon starred in six films directed by Quine. The others were My Sister Eileen (1955), The Notorious Landlady (1962) and How to Murder Your Wife (1965).

Lemmon worked with director Billy Wilder on seven films. Their association began with the gender-bending comedy Some Like It Hot (1959), with Tony Curtis and Marilyn Monroe. His role required him to perform 80% of the role in drag. People who knew his mother, Millie Lemmon, said he had mimicked her personality and even her hairstyle. Critic Pauline Kael said he was "demoniacally funny" in the part. The sequence of films with Wilder continued with The Apartment (1960) alongside Shirley MacLaine. The film received mixed reviews from critics at the time, although it has been re-evaluated as a classic today. It received 11 nominations, winning five Academy Awards for Best Picture and Best Director. Lemmon received Oscar nominations for his performances in Some Like it Hot and The Apartment. He reunited with MacLaine in Irma la Douce (1963). MacLaine, observing the director's relationship with his male lead, believed it amounted to "professional infatuation".

Lemmon's first role in a film directed by Blake Edwards was in Days of Wine and Roses (1962) portraying Joe Clay, a young alcoholic businessman. The role, for which he was nominated for the Best Actor Oscar, was one of Lemmon's favorites. By this time, he had appeared in 15 comedies, a Western and an adventure film. "The movie people put a label attached to your big toe — 'light comedy' — and that's the only way they think of you", he commented in an interview during 1984. "I knew damn well I could play drama. Things changed following Days of Wine and Roses. That was as important a film as I've ever done." Days of Wine and Roses was the first film where Lemmon was involved with production of the film via his Jalem production company. Lemmon's association with Edwards continued with The Great Race (1965), which reunited him with Tony Curtis. His salary this time was $1 million, but the film did not return its large budget at the box office. Variety, in its December 31, 1964, review, commented: "never has there been a villain so dastardly as Jack Lemmon".

1966–1978: Mid-career
In 1966, Lemmon began the first of his many collaborations with actor Walter Matthau in The Fortune Cookie. The film has been described by the British film critic Philip French as their "one truly great film". Matthau went on to win an Academy Award for his performance in the film. Another nine films with them co-starring eventually followed, including The Odd Couple (1968), The Front Page (1974), and Buddy Buddy (1981).

In 1967, Lemmon's production company Jalem produced the film Cool Hand Luke, which starred Paul Newman in the lead role. The film was a box-office and critical success. Newman, in gratitude, offered him the role of the Sundance Kid in Butch Cassidy and the Sundance Kid, but Lemmon turned it down.

The best-known Lemmon-Matthau film is The Odd Couple (1968), based on the Neil Simon play, with the lead characters being the mismatched Felix Unger (Lemmon) and Oscar Madison (Matthau), respectively neurotical and cynical. The much-admired comedy Kotch (1971), the only film Lemmon directed, starred Matthau, who was nominated for the Best Actor Oscar. The Out-of-Towners (1970) was another Neil Simon-scripted film in which Lemmon appeared.

In 1972, at the 44th Academy Awards, Jack Lemmon presented the Honorary Academy Award to silent screen legend Charlie Chaplin.
 
Lemmon starred with Juliet Mills in Avanti! (1972) and appeared with Matthau in The Front Page (1974). Both films were directed by Wilder. He felt Lemmon had a natural tendency toward overacting that had to be tempered; Wilder's biography Nobody's Perfect quotes the director as saying, "Lemmon, I would describe him as a ham, a fine ham, and with ham you have to trim a little fat." Wilder, though, also once said: "Happiness is working with Jack Lemmon".

Lemmon in Save the Tiger (1973) plays Harry Stoner, a businessman in the garment trade who finds someone to commit arson by burning down his warehouse to avoid bankruptcy. The project was rejected by multiple studios, but Paramount was prepared to make the film if it were budgeted for only $1 million. Lemmon was so keen to play the part that he worked for union scale, then $165 a week. The role was demanding; like the character, Lemmon came close to breaking point: "I started to crack as the character did," he recalled. "I just kept getting deeper and deeper into the character's despair." For this film, Lemmon won the Best Actor Oscar. Having won the Best Supporting Actor Academy Award for Mister Roberts, he became the first actor to achieve that particular double, although Helen Hayes had achieved this feat three years earlier in the equivalent female categories.

1979–2001: Final roles
Lemmon was nominated for a Best Actor Oscar for his role in The China Syndrome (1979), for which he was also awarded Best Actor at the Cannes Film Festival. In Tribute, a stage drama first performed in 1979, he played a press agent who has cancer while trying to mend his relationship with his son. The Broadway production ran for 212 performances, but it gained mixed reviews. Nevertheless, Lemmon was nominated for the Tony Award for Best Actor in a Play. For his role in the 1980 film version, Lemmon gained another Oscar nomination.

His final Oscar nomination was for Missing (1982), as a conservative father whose son has vanished in Chile during the period the country was under the rule of Augusto Pinochet; he won another Cannes award for his performance. A contemporary failure was his last film with Billy Wilder, Buddy Buddy (1981). Lemmon's character attempts suicide in a hotel while a hitman (Matthau) is in the next suite. Another flop at the box office was his final film with Blake Edwards, another of his friends; in That's Life! (1986), he appeared in the director's self-autobiographical part with Edwards' wife, Julie Andrews. A seductress role was played by Lemmon's wife, Felicia Farr. His later career is said to have been affected by other bad choices, such as Mass Appeal (1984), about a conservative Catholic priest, Macaroni (1985), a tale about old Army friends with Marcello Mastroianni, and That's Life. Lemmon received the AFI Life Achievement Award in 1988.

Lemmon was nominated for a Tony Award the second and last time for a revival of Eugene O'Neill's Long Day's Journey into Night in 1986; Lemmon had taken the lead role of James Tyrone in a production directed by Jonathan Miller. It had a London run in 1987, Lemmon's first theatre work in the city, and a television version followed. A return to London in 1989 for the antiwar play Veterans' Day, with Michael Gambon, was poorly received by critics, and following modest audiences, soon closed. Lemmon also worked with Kevin Spacey in the films The Murder of Mary Phagan (1987), Dad (1989), and Glengarry Glen Ross (1992), as well as the production of Long Day's Journey into Night.

Lemmon and Matthau had small parts in Oliver Stone's film JFK (1991), in which both men appeared without sharing screen time. The duo reunited in Grumpy Old Men (1993). The film was a surprise hit. Later in the decade, they starred together in The Grass Harp (1995), Grumpier Old Men (1995), Out to Sea (1997), and The Odd Couple II (1998). While Grumpier Old Men grossed slightly more than its predecessor, The Odd Couple II was a box-office disappointment.

In 1996, Lemmon was nominated for a Grammy Award for Best Spoken Word Or Nonmusical Album for his narration on "Harry S Truman: A Journey To Independence". Around the same time, Lemmon starred along with James Garner in the comedy My Fellow Americans (1996)  as two feuding ex-presidents. The supporting cast included Dan Aykroyd and Lauren Bacall.

For his role in the William Friedkin-directed version of Twelve Angry Men (1997), Lemmon was nominated for Best Actor in a Made-for-TV Movie in the 1998 Golden Globe Awards.
The award ceremony was memorable because Ving Rhames, who won the Golden Globe for his portrayal of Don King: Only in America, stunned the A-list crowd and television audience by calling Lemmon up to the stage and handing him the award. Lemmon tried not to accept but Rhames insisted. The emotional crowd gave Lemmon a standing ovation to which he replied that, "This is one of the nicest, sweetest moments I have ever known in my life."
The role was as the contentious juror, played in the original 1957 film version by Henry Fonda. Lemmon appeared in the remake with George C. Scott and reunited with him in another television film, this time Inherit the Wind (1999).

Lemmon was a guest voice on The Simpsons episode "The Twisted World of Marge Simpson" (1997), as the owner of the pretzel business. For his role as Morrie Schwartz in his final television role, Tuesdays with Morrie (1999), Lemmon won the Primetime Emmy Award for Outstanding Lead Actor in a Miniseries or a Movie. His final film role was uncredited: the narrator in Robert Redford's film The Legend of Bagger Vance.

Personal life
Lemmon was married twice. He and first wife actress Cynthia Stone, with whom he had a son, Chris Lemmon (born 1954), divorced. Lemmon married actress Felicia Farr on August 17, 1962, while shooting Irma La Douce in Paris. The couple's daughter, Courtney, was born in 1966. Lemmon was the stepfather to Denise, from Farr's previous marriage to Lee Farr. He was close friends with actors Tony Curtis and Kevin Spacey, among others.

His publicist Geraldine McInerney said, "I remember Jack once telling me he lived in terror his whole life that he'd never get another job. Here was one of America's most established actors and yet he was without any confidence. It was like every job was going to be his last". As the 1970s progressed, Lemmon increased his drinking to cope with stress. He was fined for driving under the influence in 1976, finally quitting alcohol in the early 1980s. On a 1998 episode of the television program Inside the Actors Studio, he stated that he was a recovering alcoholic.

Lemmon was known as the "star" of the celebrity-packed, third-round telecast of the annual AT&T Pebble Beach Pro-Am, held at Pebble Beach Golf Links each February. Lemmon's packed gallery was there not only for his humor, but also to root him on in his lifelong quest to "make the cut" to round four, something he was never able to achieve. The amateur who helps his team most in the Pro-Am portion is annually awarded the Jack Lemmon Award. During the 1980s and 1990s, Lemmon served on the advisory board of the National Student Film Institute. Lemmon was a registered Democrat.

Death

Lemmon died of bladder cancer on June 27, 2001. He had suffered from the disease privately for two years before his death. His body was interred at Westwood Village Memorial Park Cemetery in Westwood, California. (The graves of Marilyn Monroe, Walter Matthau, George C. Scott, Rodney Dangerfield, and film director Billy Wilder lie in the same cemetery.) Lemmon's gravestone reads like a title screen from a film: "JACK LEMMON in". Guests who attended the private ceremony included Billy Wilder, Shirley MacLaine, Kevin Spacey, Gregory Peck, Sidney Poitier, Kirk Douglas, Michael Douglas, Catherine Zeta-Jones, Frank Sinatra's widow Barbara and Walter Matthau's son Charlie.

Acting credits and accolades

Lemmon received eight Academy Award nominations and won for Mister Roberts (1955) and Save the Tiger (1973). He was nominated for Some Like it Hot (1959), The Apartment (1960), Days of Wine and Roses (1962), The China Syndrome (1979), Tribute (1981), and Missing (1982). He received two Tony Award nominations for his performances in Tribute (1979), and Long Day's Journey into Night (1986). He received four Golden Globe Awards from 21 nominations, and received the Golden Globe Cecil B. DeMille Award for his lifetime achievement in 1991. The year before he won the Screen Actors Guild Life Achievement Award. He was given tribute at the Kennedy Center Honors in 1996. He received a star on the Hollywood Walk of Fame in 1960.

In 1986, the U.S. National Board of Review of Motion Pictures gave Lemmon a "Career Achievement" Award; two years later, the American Film Institute gave him its Lifetime Achievement Award in March 1988. In 1995, Lemmon was awarded the inaugural Harvard Arts Medal. In 1996, Lemmon was awarded the Honorary Golden Bear award at the 46th Berlin International Film Festival.

See also
List of actors with Academy Award nominations
List of actors with two or more Academy Award nominations in acting categories
List of actors with two or more Academy Awards in acting categories

References

Sources

Wise, James. Stars in Blue: Movie Actors in America's Sea Services. Annapolis, MD: Naval Institute Press, 1997.

External links

Jack Lemmon interview with Carolyn Jackson in 1979 about The China Syndrome from Texas Archive of the Moving Image

Actor Jack Lemmon dead at 76 
Jack Lemmon at the Archive of American Television
Appearance on Desert Island Discs (8 October 1989)

1925 births
2001 deaths
American people of English descent
American people of Irish descent
20th-century American male actors
Male actors from Massachusetts
American male film actors
United States Navy personnel of World War II
Harvard College alumni
Columbia Pictures contract players
Kennedy Center honorees
Honorary Golden Bear recipients
Best Actor Academy Award winners
Best Actor BAFTA Award winners
Best Foreign Actor BAFTA Award winners
Best Miniseries or Television Movie Actor Golden Globe winners
Best Musical or Comedy Actor Golden Globe (film) winners
Best Supporting Actor Academy Award winners
Cannes Film Festival Award for Best Actor winners
Burials at Westwood Village Memorial Park Cemetery
Deaths from cancer in California
Deaths from bladder cancer
Epic Records artists
Best Performance by a Foreign Actor Genie Award winners
Outstanding Performance by a Lead Actor in a Miniseries or Movie Primetime Emmy Award winners
Outstanding Performance by a Male Actor in a Miniseries or Television Movie Screen Actors Guild Award winners
Screen Actors Guild Life Achievement Award
People from Malibu, California
Actors from Newton, Massachusetts
Phillips Academy alumni
United States Navy officers
Volpi Cup for Best Actor winners
Volpi Cup winners
American Roman Catholics
David di Donatello winners
Film directors from California
Silver Bear for Best Actor winners
Cecil B. DeMille Award Golden Globe winners
Musicians from Newton, Massachusetts
American male comedy actors
Hasty Pudding alumni
California Democrats
Massachusetts Democrats
AFI Life Achievement Award recipients
Film directors from Massachusetts
Military personnel from Massachusetts
Military personnel from California
Lemmon family
Rivers School alumni